, popularly known as simply Benkei, was a Japanese warrior monk (sōhei) who lived in the latter years of the Heian Period (794–1185)[1]. Benkei led a varied life, first becoming a monk, then a mountain ascetic, and then a rogue warrior. He later came to respect and serve the famous warrior Minamoto no Yoshitsune, also known as Ushiwakamaru. He is commonly depicted as a man of great strength and loyalty, and a popular subject of Japanese folklore, showcased in many ancient and modern literature and productions.

Early life 

Stories about Benkei's birth vary considerably. One tells how his father was the head of a temple shrine who had raped his mother, the daughter of a blacksmith. Another sees him as the offspring of a temple god. Many give him the attributes of a demon, a monster child with wild hair and long teeth. In his youth, Benkei may have been called —"demon/ogre child", and there are many famous ukiyo-e works themed on Oniwakamaru and his adventures. He is said to have defeated 200 men in each battle he was personally involved in.

Benkei chose to join the monastic establishment at an early age and traveled widely among the Buddhist monasteries of Japan. During this period, monasteries were not only important centers of administration and culture, but also military powers in their own right, similar to the Roman Legions. Like many other monks, Benkei was likely trained in the use of the naginata, the half-moon spear.

At this point, he left the monasteries, and became a yamabushi, a member of a sect of mountain ascetics. Benkei was commonly depicted wearing a black cap that was a signature theme of such mountain ascetics.

Seven weapons
Benkei armed himself with seven weapons, and is often depicted carrying these on his back. In addition to his sword, he carried a broad axe (masakari), a rake (kumade), a sickle (nagigama), a wooden mallet (hizuchi), a saw (nokogiri), an iron staff (tetsubō), and a Japanese glaive (naginata).

Career

Benkei was said to have wandered around Kyoto every night on a personal quest to take 1000 swords from samurai warriors, who he believed were arrogant and unworthy. After collecting 999 swords through duels and looking for his final prize, he met a young man playing a flute at Gojotenjin Shrine in Kyoto. The much shorter man supposedly carried a gilded sword around his waist. Instead of dueling at the shrine itself, the two walked to Gojo Bridge in the city where the bigger Benkei ultimately lost to the smaller warrior, who happened to be Minamoto no Yoshitsune, a son of Minamoto no Yoshitomo. Some sources claim  that the fight took place not at the Gojo Bridge, but instead at Matsubara Bridge. Not long after the duel, Benkei, frustrated and looking for revenge, waited for Yoshitsune at the Buddhist temple of Kiyomizu, where he lost yet again.  Henceforth, he became Yoshitsune's retainer and fought with him in the Genpei War against the Taira clan.

From 1185 until his death in 1189, Benkei accompanied Yoshitsune as an outlaw.

Death
In the end, Benkei and Yoshitsune were encircled in the castle of Koromogawa no tate. As Yoshitsune retired to the inner keep of the castle to commit ritual suicide (seppuku) on his own, Benkei stood guard on the bridge in front of the main gate to protect Yoshitsune. It is said that the soldiers were afraid to cross the bridge to confront him, and that all who did met a swift death at the hands of the gigantic man, who killed in excess of 300 trained soldiers.

Realizing that close combat would mean suicide, the warriors following Minamoto no Yoritomo decided to shoot and kill Benkei with arrows instead. Long after the battle should have been over, the soldiers noticed that the arrow-riddled, wound-covered Benkei was still standing. When the soldiers dared to cross the bridge and take a closer look, the giant man fell to the ground, having died standing upright. This is known as the "Standing Death of Benkei" (Benkei no Tachi Ōjō). Benkei died at the age of 34.

Atago-do, now called Benkei-do, features a statue of Benkei six feet two inches in height in the posture he stood in when he died at Koromogawa. It was built in the era of Shotoku (1711–1716), replacing an older monument. In olden times the Benkei-do was at the foot of Chusonji hill until it was demolished. The ruins and a single pine tree still remain.

In popular culture

Tales of Benkei's loyalty and honour have made him a mainstay of Japanese folklore, as well as a popular subject for literature and entertainment.

One kabuki play places Benkei in a moral dilemma, caught between lying and protecting his lord in order to cross a bridge. The critical moment of the drama is its climax, where the monk realises his situation and vows to do what he must. In another play, Benkei slays his own child to save the daughter of a lord. In the Noh play Ataka, Benkei must beat his own master (disguised as a porter) in order to avoid breaking his disguise. Ataka was later adapted into the kabuki play Kanjinchō, which became one of the most popular and widely performed works in Japanese theatre.

Film and television
A silent, black and white film adaptation of Benkei's story, simply titled Benkei, was released in 1912.

Denjirō Ōkōchi portrays Benkei in Akira Kurosawa's 1945 film The Men Who Tread on the Tiger's Tail, based on Kanjinchō.

In the Getter Robo series, the characters of Musashi Tomoe and Benkei Kuruma are both modelled on Saitō Musashibō Benkei. Musashi is the toughest and most loyal member of the original team, and dies in a similar way to Benkei - fighting off an immense horde of enemies by himself while his teammates are incapacitated - after which Benkei Kuruma is recruited to take his place. The New Getter Robo anime condenses the roles of both characters into one, called simply Musashibō Benkei, who is a monk like his namesake.

Daisuke Ryu portrays Benkei in Sogo Ishii's 2001 historical fantasy film Gojoe: Spirit War Chronicle.

Ken Matsudaira portrays Benkei in the 44th Taiga Drama, Yoshitsune.

Sō Kaku portrays Benkei in the 61st Taiga Drama, The 13 Lords of the Shogun.

Video games
Benkei and Yoshitsune are the protagonists of the 2005 video game Genji: Dawn of the Samurai and its 2006 sequel, Genji: Days of the Blade.

See also
Benkei on the Bridge
Funa Benkei

Notes

References
 Ribner, Susan, Richard Chin and Melanie Gaines Arwin. (1978). The Martial Arts. New York: Harper & Row. .
 Kitagawa, Hiroshi and Bruce T. Tsuchida. (1975). The Tale of the Heike. Tokyo: University of Tokyo Press. .
 Yoshikawa, Eiji. (1956). The Heike Story: A Modern Translation of the Classic Tale of Love and War. New York: Alfred A. Knopf.  (cloth).
 _. (1981). The Heike Story: A Modern Translation of the Classic Tale of Love and War. Tokyo: Tuttle Publishing.  (paper).
 _. (2002). The Heike Story: A Modern Translation of the Classic Tale of Love and War. Tokyo: Tuttle Publishing.  (paper).
   _. (1989)  Yoshikawa Eiji Rekishi Jidai Bunko (Eiji Yoshikawa's Historical Fiction), Vols. 47–62 Shin Heike monogatari (新平家物語). Tokyo: Kodansha.  .

External links

 Grunwald Center for the Graphic Arts, UCLA Hammer Museum: woodcut print – "Ushiwaka and Benki duelling on Gojo Bridge" or "Gojo Bridge, an episode from the Life of Yoshitsune, Chronicles of Yoshitsune" by Tsukioka Yoshitoshi (1839–1892)

1155 births
1189 deaths
Japanese folklore
Japanese warrior monks
Japanese warriors killed in battle
Kabuki characters
People of Heian-period Japan
People of Kamakura-period Japan
Heian period Buddhist clergy